Amnatos is a local community of the Rethymno Municipality in the  Rethymno (regional unit) of the region of Crete established by Kallikratis reform. Previously, it was part of the municipal district of Municipality of Arkadi. 
Amnatos is a traditional settlement and is classified in Class II, that is of "average cultural value" (Government Gazette 728/21-9-1995). Buildings with Venetian architectural elements are scattered throughout the village. In 2005 Amnatos received an award of the "cleaner and organized traditional community".

Geography
It is located on the northeastern edges of the Gargano mountain, 17 km southeast of Rethymno, on the way to Arkadi, at an altitude of 320 m. It has a view of the North Sea and the Cretan mountain Psiloreitis.

Origin of name and history
The location of the village appears to have been inhabited since ancient times and it is believed that the name Amnatos has Minoan origin. Ancient Greeks used to call amnion all those vessels used at their time to collect the blood of sacrificed animals.

The area was occupied by the Venetians and the Ottomans.

Nowadays, the local community of Amnatos consists of four settlements: Amnatos, Kapsaliana (Καψαλιανά), Pikris (Πίκρης) and the Arkadi Monastery.
Population of  Amnatos

Attractions: monuments, temples, and important buildings 
Among the many Venetian buildings in the village of Amnatos, there is a house with a particularly impressive doorframe. The crown of the gable has the inscription: "INITIUM SAPIENTE TIMOR DOMINI" (in English: "The Beginning of Wisdom is Fear of the Lord").

There is also a  folk museum and a Municipal Museum of the History of Greek Education.

Amnatos is the home village of Harikleia Daskalaki, a heroine of the Arkadi holocaust. A statue of her is found in the square of the village.

Transportation
There is bus service (KTEL) from and to Rethymnon in this area (route for Arkadi Monastery, which has three services on weekdays and two on weekends).

References

External links
 Photo Gallery, Web site of municipality of Rethymnno retrieved 9 April 2012
  ΡΕΘΥΜΝΟ ΔΙΑΚΟΠΕΣ ΞΕΝΟΔΟΧΕΙΑ ΕΝΟΙΚΙΑΖΟΜΕΝΑ ΔΩΜΑΤΙΑ ΒΙΛΕΣ ΚΡΗΤΗ. ΡΕΘΥΜΝΟ ΠΟΛΙΤΙΣΜΟΣ ΦΥΣΗ ΠΑΡΑΔΟΣΗ | Ελληνικά | Καλωσορίσατε στον δικτυακό τόπο του Ρεθύμνου - Τουριστική Προβολή (Cycling routes, Web site of municipality of Rethymnno), retrieved 9 April 2012

Populated places in Rethymno (regional unit)